Dome 2 is the second studio album by English post-punk band Dome, released in 1980 by record label Dome.

Content 

Dome 2 "continues the ambient/minimalist experimentation of the first two albums".

Track listing

Personnel 
Credits adapted from liner notes.

Engineering
 Eric Radcliffe
 John Fryer

Dome
 Bruce Gilbert
 Graham Lewis

References

External links 

 

1980 albums
Dome (band) albums